Protognathia is a genus of crustaceans belonging to the monotypic family Protognathiidae.

The species of this genus are found in southernmost South Hemisphere.

Species:

Protognathia bathypelagica 
Protognathia waegeli

References

Crustaceans